This list of botanical gardens and arboretums in Illinois is intended to include all significant botanical gardens and arboretums in the U.S. state of Illinois.

See also
List of botanical gardens and arboretums in the United States

References

 
 
Tourist attractions in Illinois
botanical gardens and arboretums in Illinois